Tuy Hòa is the capital city of Phú Yên Province in south-central Vietnam. The city is located approximately midway between Nha Trang and Qui Nhơn. The city is formulated mainly from alluvial of the downstream of Đà Rằng River. There are two mountains in the center of the city: Chóp Chài Mountain and Nhạn Mountain. There is a Champa Temple on the top of Nhạn Mountain.

Climate
Tuy Hòa has a tropical savanna climate (Köppen climate classification: As).

Infrastructure

Transportation

By air

The city is served by Đông Tác Airport which lies south of Tuy Hòa.

By land
Tuy Hòa Railway Station is a stop on the North-South Railway. National Route 1 runs through the city, providing road connections to Hanoi in the north and Ho Chi Minh City in the south.

Gallery

References

Populated places in Phú Yên province
Districts of Phú Yên province
 
Cities in Vietnam
Provincial capitals in Vietnam